Prince Mumba (born on 24 March 2001) is a Zambian professional footballerformer solwezi academy football club in solwezi and he joined the super league side kabwe worriors football club, who plays as a midfielder for Kabwe Warriors and the Zambian national team.

He debuted internationally on 5 June 2021 in a 3–1 friendly defeat against Senegal.

On 3 September 2021, Mumba scored his first goal for Zambia in a 2022 FIFA World Cup qualifier against Mauritania, which they won 2–1.

International career

International goals
Scores and results list Zambia's goal tally first.

References

External links
 
 

2001 births
Living people
Zambian footballers
Zambia international footballers
Association football midfielders
Kabwe Warriors F.C. players
Zambia Super League players